Dr. Walter B. Hill Jr. (22 May 1949 – 29 July 2008) was a scholar, historian and archivist. He worked with the Smithsonian and the National Archives for 30 years, and wrote and edited for many academic journals. He was an advocate of diversity in archives and specialized in African American history. He is most well known as the consulting historian for the film, Glory, which earned heavy praise on its historical accuracy. He was featured as a special speaker for several conferences and events throughout his career. He frequently appeared on C-SPAN to discuss historical topics and controversies, especially topics pertaining to the American Civil War, African American history, and slavery.

Early life and education 
Hill was born in St. Louis, Missouri on May 22, 1949.

He attended the College of Wooster for his bachelor's degree in history, which he achieved in 1971. He then attended Northern Illinois University for his master's degree in American history and graduated in 1973. He taught at St. Louis University for a few years after obtaining his masters before returning to school to begin his doctoral work in 1977. As a doctoral student, he worked as a teaching assistant and later an instructor for the Afro-American Studies Program. He also began work at the National Archives and Records Administration as a research student in the Office of the Archivist and Office of Federal Records. And in 1983, Hill was awarded a doctoral fellowship at the Museum of American History, Smithsonian Institution. In 1988, Hill earned his Ph.D. from the University of Maryland, under the guidance of historian Ira Berlin.

Professional career 
Hill began work at the National Archives and Records Administration while working toward his doctoral degree but stepped down in 1983 for his fellowship from the Smithsonian. In 1984, after he had finished his fellowship, he returned to NARA as an archivist in the Office of the National Archives, remaining there until 1990. He called NARA “a special place for me in my professional life and my work is a testimony to the institution that allowed me to navigate the rich history of Americans, in particular African Americans.”

Also in 1984, Hill became an adjunct professor at Howard University, where he taught African American History. He continued to teach here until his death.

In 1990, he became the director of the Modern Archives Institute and subject specialist in Afro-American history. He stayed until 1995 when he moved to their new facility in College Park, Maryland, where he assumed the role of senior archivist and specialist for Afro-American history and federal records.

Affiliations 
He appeared on several television shows and documentaries as a historian. Some of his appearances include on Good Morning America, Washington Journal and Fox TV. He has also appeared in film, although in behind the scenes roles. He is most well known for his role as the film consultant for the 1989 film Glory, which followed the 54th Massachusetts Colored Infantry in the Civil War. The film has been praised by critics and historians for its gritty realism and historical accuracy, as well as its bringing African American Civil War soldiers to the forefront of public consciousness.

He has also served as editor or on the editorial board of many publications such as the African American History Bulletin and the Executive Council of the Association for the Study of Afro-American History. He has written and researched many articles, guides, essays and papers, all on African American History. His work has been published in journals such as Newsletter of the American Historical Association and the Journal of Minority Issues.

In addition to his writings and publications, Hill has also spoken at many conferences, symposiums and panels, and has made many major contributions to organizations dedicated to African American history.

Hill has also served as the Chief Historian for the African-American Civil War Memorial Foundation. In addition, he served on the Maryland Commission on African American History and Culture. He served as consultant to the Organization of American Historians and chaired their Historical Documentation and Research Committee.

In 2006, Hill was honored for his work as archivist and historian. He was presented with a Certificate of Appreciation by Archivist of the United States, Allen Weinstein. In 2009, one year after his death, NARA colleagues at the annual Association for the Study of African American Life and History (ASALH) luncheon reserved and dedicated a table in his honor. They have reserved this table at every luncheon since.

References 

1949 births
2008 deaths
American archivists
Historians of the United States
American librarians
Smithsonian Institution
20th-century scholars